Badminton at the 2022 ASEAN Para Games was held at Edutorium Muhammadiyah University of Surakarta.

Originally set to be host by Vietnam in 2021, the Games were initially cancelled due to the COVID-19 pandemic in Vietnam before hosting rights were transferred to Indonesia. It is also originally scheduled from 23 to 30 July 2022, later moved to 30 July to 6 August 2022.

Classification
There were six different classes in the competition.

Medal summary

Medalists

Men

Women

Mixed

See also
Badminton at the 2021 Southeast Asian Games

References

External links
 Badminton at Games Result System  

2022 ASEAN Para Games
Badminton at the ASEAN Para Games
Badminton in Indonesia
2022 in badminton